Theresa Secord (born 1958) is an artist, basketmaker, geologist and activist from Maine. She is a member of the Penobscot nation, and the great-granddaughter of the well-known weaver Philomene Saulis Nelson. She co-founded, and was the director of, the Maine Indian Basketmakers Alliance (MIBA) in Bar Harbor, Maine.

When apprenticing with basketmaker Madeline Tomer Shay, Secord learned that she was one of few young Wabanaki people who was taught to make brown ash and sweet-grass baskets. After Shay's death, Secord founded MIBA in 1993 as a way to preserve Wabanaki language and culture. In 2003, the MIBA received the International Prize for Rural Creativity in part for lowering the average age of basketmakers in Maine from 63 to 43.

Her work has been shown at the Hudson Museum at the University of Maine, at the National Museum of the American Indian in New York, and at the Southwest Museum of the American Indian in Los Angeles. She is the great niece of the renowned Penobscot dancer, actress and writer Molly Spotted Elk, and her great-grandmother is Philomene Saulis Nelson, considered an "acclaimed weaver."

Education 
Secord earned a B.A. in Geology from the University of Southern Maine in 1981 and an M.S. in Economic Geology from the University of Wisconsin-Madison in 1984. She served as Staff Geologist for the Penobscot Nation. Secord studied weaving and Penobscot language with Madeline Tomer Shay from 1988 to 1993.

Personal life 
Secord has two sons, Caleb Hoffman and Will Hoffman. Both are basketmakers.

Awards and honors 
Secord received the "Prize for Women's Creativity in Rural Life" by the Women's World Summit Foundation in 2003 for helping rural basket makers rise out of poverty, becoming the first U.S. citizen to receive this award. She was one of five award winners invited to present her work at the United Nations Commission on Human Rights in Geneva, Switzerland.
In 2009, she received the Community Spirit Award from the First Peoples Fund. 
She was a recipient of a 2016 National Heritage Fellowship awarded by the National Endowment for the Arts, which is the United States government's highest honor in the folk and traditional arts. 
She was the 2017 Bernard Osher Lecturer at the Portland Museum of Art.

Published works 
Changing Faces of Tradition: A Report on the Folk and Traditional Art in the United States - Chapter 5 Organizing
Two Maine Forest Pests: A Comparison of Approaches to Understanding Threats to Hemlock and Ash Trees in Maine

References

Women basketweavers
Native American basket weavers
Artists from Maine
Penobscot people
Living people
1958 births
National Heritage Fellowship winners
University of Southern Maine alumni
University of Wisconsin–Madison College of Letters and Science alumni
20th-century Native Americans
21st-century Native Americans
21st-century Native American women
20th-century American women artists
21st-century American women artists